Manuel Zamora may refer to:
Manuel E. Zamora (born 1950), Filipino politician
Manuel B. Zamora, Jr. (born 1942), businessman, founder of Nickel Asia Corporation
Manuel A. Zamora (1870–1929), Filipino chemist and pharmacist